The Interscholastic Association of Southeast Asian Schools (IASAS) is an association of six private schools in and around Southeast Asia. The member schools are International School Bangkok (Thailand), International School of Kuala Lumpur (Malaysia), International School Manila (Philippines), Jakarta Intercultural School (Indonesia), Singapore American School (Singapore), and Taipei American School (Taiwan).

High level competitions and events involving teams or groups from the IASAS schools are held throughout the school year in areas of sports, or cultural and artistic events. Sports competitions are organized into three separate seasons, and tournaments are held at the end of approximately 10-week seasons. Cultural and Artistic events are held in separate seasons from sports, with Model United Nations during one season (non-competitive event), and the Arts events during another season. Each of the IASAS schools rotate the hosting of events, based on available facilities and current events of each country. While participating in events, students are expected to adhere to a strict code of conduct. Students traveling to other schools to participate in IASAS events stay with families of students from the host school. The events, organized by season, are listed below.

Sports
The first season of IASAS, held in October, includes soccer, volleyball, and cross country running. The second season of IASAS, held in January, includes basketball, rugby union (for men), touch rugby (for women), swimming, and tennis. The third season of IASAS, held in April, includes badminton, fastpitch softball (for women) and baseball (for men), golf, and track and field. In addition to the culminating IASAS events that occur at the end of each season, athletics exchanges are held during the season so that teams have an opportunity to see the competition from the other schools. These exchanges usually only involve three or four of the IASAS schools at a time, and no awards are given for winning an exchange. In fall 2019, International School of Manila held a 'Super IASAS', with all season one sports occurring in the same location. SAS won five of the six sports, with the exception of girls volleyball, where TAS beat SAS in straight sets. This was a part of their centennial celebration. In the 2020-21 and the 2021-22 academic year, no in-person IASAS events were held in light of the ongoing effects of the COVID-19 pandemic.

Non-competitive events
Leadership Convention was canceled starting from the 2008-2009 academic year due to the effort to reduce the unnecessary travel for non-competitive events. A conference for student peer-helper groups took place in September 2005, 2006 and 2007, but has since been discontinued. Model United Nations is held in November, usually with additional schools participating.

Cultural convention
Cultural Convention is held in March and includes three separate events: "Music", "Dance, Drama, Art and Theatre Tech (Stagecraft)", and "Debate and Forensics". The music delegation includes choir, strings, band and pianists. Forensics events include Original Oratory, Oral Interpretation, Extemporaneous Speaking, and Impromptu. Though the three components of Cultural Convention take place concurrently, they are typically hosted in different locations. Cultural convention, as of 2023, was held from March 1st - 5th. In the Forensics and Debate branch, held at the Singapore American School, the International School of Bangkok placed first in Debate, with ISB Team A compromising of 3 speakers, Ella Wilner, Piriyakorn Piroonhapat (Nami), and Chino Supawattanapong.

Other events
Math is not held as a traveling event but as a competition comparing the American Mathematics Contest results of students from each school. Top scores from the AMC 12 test are used to comprise the Varsity math team and the top scores from the AMC 10 test are used to comprise the Junior Varsity math team.
Chess has been an experimental event since 2013
The IASAS Film Exchange has been ongoing since 2016, where a film is chosen by each IASAS school to be represented
The IASAS Service Conference has been ongoing virtually since 2021, with service clubs and projects from each school sharing their work to service leaders across the IASAS schools.

References